Antonio de Oliveira (born August 12, 1940), is a former Brazilian soccer player who played in the NASL.

Career statistics

Club

Notes

References

Living people
Brazilian footballers
Brazilian expatriate footballers
Association football forwards
Cruzeiro Esporte Clube players
Washington Whips players
North American Soccer League (1968–1984) players
Expatriate soccer players in the United States
Brazilian expatriate sportspeople in the United States
1940 births